David C. Burns is an American politician from Maine. Burns is a  former Republican State Senator from Maine's 29th District, representing part of Penobscot, Hancock county and Washington Counties, including his residence of Whiting. He was first elected to the Maine House of Representatives in 2008 and the Maine State Senate in 2012, replacing fellow Republican and Senate President Kevin Raye.

References

Year of birth missing (living people)
Living people
Republican Party members of the Maine House of Representatives
Republican Party Maine state senators
People from Washington County, Maine
21st-century American politicians